Lebanon is a city in St. Clair County, Illinois, United States. The population was 4,418 at the 2010 census and had decreased to an estimated 4,256 as of 2018. Like many other places in "Little Egypt" or Southern Illinois, Lebanon was named after the Eastern Mediterranean country of the same name. It is a part of the Metro-East region of the Greater St. Louis metropolitan area.

Lebanon is home to McKendree University, the oldest college in Illinois.

Registered historic places
 Emerald Mound and Village Site
 Lebanon Historic District
 Mermaid House Hotel

Geography
Lebanon is located at  (38.603398, -89.811271).

Demographics

As of the census of 2010, there were 5,523 people, 1,275 households, and 804 families residing in the city. The racial makeup of the city was 78.46% White, 18.45% African American, 0.34% Native American, 0.48% Asian, 0.09% Pacific Islander, 0.40% from other races, and 1.79% from two or more races. Hispanic or Latino of any race were 1.53% of the population.

There were 1,275 households, out of which 28.8% had children under the age of 18 living with them, 48.2% were married couples living together, 11.5% had a female householder with no husband present, and 36.9% were non-families. 28.5% of all households were made up of individuals, and 12.9% had someone living alone who was 65 years of age or older. The average household size was 2.41 and the average family size was 2.98.

In the city, the population was spread out, with 20.8% under the age of 18, 18.6% from 18 to 24, 22.9% from 25 to 44, 21.0% from 45 to 64, and 16.7% who were 65 years of age or older. The median age was 36 years. For every 100 females, there were 84.7 males. For every 100 females age 18 and over, there were 80.8 males.

The median income for a household in the city was $37,042, and the median income for a family was $48,711. Males had a median income of $30,597 versus $21,341 for females. The per capita income for the city was $17,125. About 9.8% of families and 13.4% of the population were below the poverty line, including 14.2% of those under age 18 and 7.1% of those age 65 or over.

Education
Lebanon is home to the oldest founded college in the state of Illinois, McKendree University, and is also home to Lebanon Grade School And Lebanon High School (home of the Greyhounds).

Newspapers
There have been at least a dozen newspapers that have called Lebanon home. The Lebanon Advertiser has operated there since 1911. On December 26, 2013, it was purchased by David Porter. The former owner, Harrison Leon Church, owned the newspaper for 40 years. Except for a few months between Harrison and his father, Leon Church, the Church family owned the newspaper for 75 years.

Notable people 

 Christine Brewer, Grammy Award-winning operatic/classical singer, graduate of McKendree University, has resided in Lebanon, Illinois for many years
 Ed Busch, MLB shortstop for St. Louis Browns and Philadelphia Phillies
 Bill Cofield, former University of Wisconsin basketball head coach, graduate of McKendree University
 Mark Consuelos, daytime soap actor, known for playing Mateo Santos on All My Children, and Hiram Lodge on Riverdale. Married to Kelly Ripa
 Neal Cotts, relief pitcher for 2005 World Series champion Chicago White Sox, also for Minnesota Twins, Milwaukee Brewers, Texas Rangers, Oakland Athletics, Chicago Cubs
 Craig Virgin, two-time world cross-country champion, nine-time Big Ten champion and three-time Olympian in track and field

References

External links
 City of Lebanon

Cities in Illinois
Cities in St. Clair County, Illinois